Diamesus osculans, is a species of carrion beetle found in Sri Lanka, Indonesia, Philippines, Laos, China, Australia.

Description
It is the largest species carrion beetle in the subfamily Silphinae which is commonly found on decaying corpse with forensic value. Adults can be easily attracted by light trap and animal remains.

Genetics
In 2020, the complete mitochondrial genome of the species was assembled. It comprised with 19,398 base pairs in length with a total of 22 tRNA genes, 2 rRNA, and 13 protein-coding genes (PCG).

Gallery

References 

Silphidae
Insects of Sri Lanka
Insects of India
Insects described in 1825